The 2015–16 Edmonton Oilers season was the 37th season for the National Hockey League (NHL) franchise that was established on June 22, 1979, and 44th season, including their play in the World Hockey Association (WHA). The season began its regular games on October 8, 2015, against the St. Louis Blues, and concluded with a home and away series on April 6 and 9, 2016 against the Vancouver Canucks; the Oilers' final home game on April 6 was their final game at Rexall Place, its home arena since 1974. The team moved to the new downtown Rogers Place for the 2016–17 season.

Standings

Schedule and results

Pre-season 
The Oilers finished 1st in the West for the preseason; the Red Wings finished first in the East.

Regular season

Player statistics
Final stats

Skaters

Goaltenders

†Denotes player spent time with another team before joining the Oilers. Stats reflect time with the Oilers only.
‡Traded mid-season. Stats reflect time with the Oilers only.
Bold/italics denotes franchise record

Awards and honours

Awards

Milestones

Transactions
Following the end of the Oilers' 2014–15 season, and during the 2015–16 season, this team has been involved in the following transactions:

Trades

Notes
Edmonton to retain 50% ($1.95 million) of salary as part of trade.
Anaheim to retain 25% ($0.5 million) of salary as part of trade.

Free agents acquired

Free agents lost

Claimed via waivers

Lost via waivers

Lost via retirement

Player signings

Draft picks

Below are the Edmonton Oilers' selections at the 2015 NHL Entry Draft, to be held on June 26–27, 2015 at the BB&T Center in Sunrise, Florida. The Edmonton Oilers won the 2015 draft lottery that took place on April 18, 2015

Draft notes

 The Edmonton Oilers' second-round pick went to the Tampa Bay Lightning as the result of a trade on June 26, 2015 that sent the Rangers' first-round pick in 2015 to the New York Islanders in exchange for Florida's third-round pick in 2015 and this pick. The Islanders previously acquired this pick as the result of a trade on June 26, 2015 that sent Griffin Reinhart to Edmonton in exchange for Pittsburgh's first-round pick in 2015 and this pick.
The Edmonton Oilers' third-round pick went to the Tampa Bay Lightning as the result of a trade on November 28, 2014 that sent Eric Brewer to Anaheim in exchange for this pick. Anaheim previously acquired this pick as the result of a trade on March 4, 2014 that sent Viktor Fasth to Edmonton in exchange for a fifth-round pick in 2014 and this pick.
 The Edmonton Oilers' fourth-round pick went to the St. Louis Blues as the result of a trade on July 10, 2013 that sent David Perron and a third-round pick in 2015 to Edmonton in exchange for Magnus Paajarvi, a second-round pick in 2014 and this pick.
 The Montreal Canadiens' fourth-round pick went to the Edmonton Oilers as the result of a trade on March 2, 2015 that sent Jeff Petry to Montreal in exchange for a second-round pick in 2015 and this pick (being conditional at the time of the trade). The condition – Edmonton will receive a fourth-round pick in 2015 if Montreal advances to the second round of the 2015 Stanley Cup playoffs – was converted on April 26, 2015 when Montreal eliminated Ottawa in first-round of the 2015 Stanley Cup playoffs.
 The Edmonton Oilers' seventh-round pick went to the New York Rangers as the result of a trade on June 27, 2015 that sent Cam Talbot and a seventh-round pick in 2015 to Edmonton in exchange for Montreal's second-round pick in 2015, Ottawa's third-round pick in 2015, and this pick.
 The Anaheim Ducks' seventh-round pick went to the Edmonton Oilers as the result of a trade on June 27, 2015 that sent Dallas' seventh-round pick in 2016 to Tampa Bay in exchange for this pick.
 The New York Rangers' seventh-round pick went to the Edmonton Oilers as the result of a trade on June 27, 2015 that sent Montreal's second-round pick in 2015, Ottawa's third-round pick in 2015, and seventh-round pick in 2015 to the Rangers in exchange for Cam Talbot and this pick.

References

Edmonton Oilers seasons
Edmonton Oilers season, 2015-16
Edmont